In baseball statistics, total chances (TC), also called chances offered, represents the number of plays in which a defensive player has participated. It is the sum of putouts plus assists plus errors. Chances accepted refers to the total of putouts and assists only.

See also
 Fielding percentage

References

Fielding statistics